The  is a fourth generation main battle tank of JSDF produced by Mitsubishi Heavy Industries for the Japanese Ground Self Defense Force, entering service in 2012. Compared with other currently-serving main battle tanks in the JGSDF, the Type 10 has been equipped with enhancements in its capability to respond to anti-tank warfare and other contingencies.

Overview
The TK-X (MBT-X) project aimed to produce the new Type 10 main battle tank, to replace or complement the existing Type 74 and Type 90 main battle tanks that are currently in service with the Japan Ground Self Defense Force. Development began in the 1990s, and production was expected to start in 2010–2011. A prototype was revealed on February 13, 2008 at the Technology Research and Development Institute (TRDI) in Sagamihara. Heavy emphasis was placed on C4I capabilities as well as on performance, firepower, protection and mobility.

Design

Development history
In the early 2000s, Japan decided to update its tank force to better prepare for 21st century warfare. One of the most important requirements for the new tank is the capability of having a C4I (Command, Control, Communication, Computing and Intelligence) system.

After assessing the upgrade potential of current Type 74 and Type 90 main battle tanks, the Ministry of Defense concluded that there was not enough internal space for a C4I system upgrade on existing tanks. Therefore, the development of a new main battle tank capable of various future battle missions was necessary.

Armor
The use of modular components significantly improved the side armor compared to the Type 90. The Commander's Panoramic Sight was moved to the right and is located at a higher position than the Type 90, giving the commander a wide range of view.

The vehicle's armor consists of modular sections, providing the ability to mount varying degrees of protection depending on the mission profile and weight requirements. Vehicle weight is 40 tonnes in base configuration, 44 tonnes in standard configuration, and 48 tonnes in full configuration (fully equipped). The prototype featured in 2008 at TRDI weighed 44 tonnes.

Compared to the Type 90, the Type 10 is lighter. However, the weight of the composite armor has been greatly increased, from 1,380 kg to 1,940 kg for the turret and from 1,249 kg to 2,680 kg for the hull. In the penetration resistance test, APFSDS type IV (Prototype of Type 10 APFSDS) was used to shoot at full load from 250 m based on the Japanese Ministry of Defense standard "Resilience test method for armored kinetic energy bullets NDS Z 0012B". As a result, it is said that each composite armor module and mantlet achieved the required performance based on the required specification "Type 10 tank GV-Y120001E" for frontal protection.

The source describes it this way.

"This case is related to the bullet resistance test of the front main part of the new tank conducted at the Kamioka Branch Office of Nippon Oil & Fat Co.
This case is to evaluate the bullet resistance of the module armor by shooting at a range of 250m using a 120mm Mounted Gun Type IV, one of the prototypes of the new tank, in the bullet resistance test of the front main part conducted at the Kamioka Sub-branch of Nippon Oil & Fat Co. The test is to evaluate the bullet resistance of the module armor."

The Type 10 tank's protection against 120 mm class KE is limited to the front of the turret and gun mantlet, and the front of the hull, except for the lowest part.

The Type 10 tank has additional armor to counter various threats.

 Additional armor type 1 Mounted on the sides of the turret and hull. It is passive armor "A".
 Additional armor type 2 Attached to the sides of the turret and hull. It is passive armor "B" (composite armor).
 Additional armor For top surface. Attached to the upper surface of the turret and hull. It is passive armor "A".
 Low-threat turret module armor
 Low-threat hull module armor

The composite armor technology has been greatly improved compared to the Type 90, and it has become possible to make it with the same protective performance at a reduced weight. As for the basic armor, "nanocrystal" steel and triple hardness steel are used to improve the protection performance.

The upper surface armor adopts a lightweight bulletproof structure for the upper surface and can effectively respond to Explosively formed penetrators and the like.

Armament
Whereas the Type 90 used the same 120 mm Rheinmetall main gun as the Leopard 2 tanks, the Type 10 uses a completely new 120mm smoothbore gun, developed indigenously by Japan Steel Works. The Type 10's new cannon can fire an improved round, the newly developed Type 10 APFSDS round, which is specifically designed for and can only be fired by the Type 10. 

The Type 10 APFSDS round is composed of amorphous metals containing heavy metal particles. Lightweight ammunition is fired at high initial velocity (estimated 1,780m/s) due to high pressure. The Japan Steel Works L/44 120 mm has 640 MPa pressure and shoots a 7.8 kg projectile, while the longer Rheinmetall Rh-120 L/55 120 mm has 570 MPa pressure and shoots the heavier DM53 8.35 kg projectile at a similar: 1,750 m/s. The new ammunition is designed to penetrate reactive armor such as ['Kontakt-5']. 

The Type 10 tank can also fire the JM33 APFSDS (license produced DM33 shell acquired from Germany) as well as all standard 120 mm NATO ammunition. The Type 10 can load 14 rounds in the autoloader, 2 rounds behind the gunner, and 6 rounds in the ready ammunition storage; with a total of 36 rounds carried on board.

Electronics
The Type 10 tank is equipped with a C4I system (command, control, communication, computer & intelligence) called "10NW". This system can be incorporated into the JGSDF network to enable sharing of information among tanks in real-time conjunction with "Field Communication System" (FiCS), as well as connected to the infantry's outdoor computer network "Regiment Command Control System" (ReCS) to facilitate integrated military operations with the infantry troops.

Currently, the Type 10 tank is the only MBT equipped with the FCP (Fire Control Picture)-level C4I.

According to the specifications described in "Type 10 tank GV-Y120001E", it has the following functions.
 The search range for each vehicle can be specified from the platoon leader's vehicle.
 The detected target is collated with the database and automatically identified, and the distance, position, type, etc. are automatically shared within the platoon.
 It is possible to instruct each vehicle from the platoon leader's vehicle. It is possible to instruct both concentrated shooting and shooting at individual targets.
 The platoon leader's vehicle automatically knows where and when the vehicle under command is aiming.
 When aiming, FCS collates with the database and automatically aims at weak points.
 When landing, FCS will judge the effect from the landing position and enemy vehicle type, and if uncertain, it will recommend a re-attack.
 Automatically track multiple detected targets, determine the threat level, and recommend to occupants.

Other features are as follows:
 Continuously variable transmission (CVT) that allows the tank to reach 70 km/h forward as well as reverse.
 An autoloader faster than that of the Type 90, allowing the main gun to fire continuously with an interval of about 3.5 seconds.
 Hydropneumatic active suspension, which allows it to adjust its stance and absorbs recoil when firing.
 Day/night sights mounted around the turret, providing a full 360° coverage as well as providing input to the C4I system.

Strategic transportation
The predecessor of the Type 10, the Type 90 main battle tank, was deployed only in Hokkaido due to the weight limit of roads and bridges in other parts of Japan. One of the primary purposes of Type 10 is to be able to deploy anywhere in Japan. Size and weight reductions have made the Type 10 six tonnes lighter than the Type 90, weighing only 44 tonnes. 84% of Japan's 17,920 bridges are passable for the Type 10, compared to only 65% for the Type 90 and 40% for mainstream western main battle tanks.

Development
The development costs as of 2008 are approximately JPY ¥48,400M (approximately USD $450M). Each unit is expected to cost approximately ¥700M ($6.5M).

The Japanese Ministry of Defense formally acknowledged the Type 10 in December 2009.
In 2010, the Japanese Ministry of Defense placed a ¥12,400M order for thirteen Type 10 tanks (unit cost: ¥954M).

These Type 10 tanks entered JGSDF service in January, 2012.Production continues at a modest but steady rate. Spring of 2020, there were 76 Type 10 tanks in service, with plans to order 12 more that year.

Export attempt
On 4 January 2014, sources revealed that Turkey was interested in signing a joint development deal of tank engines based on the Type 10's engine. The engine was to power the Turkish Altay tank. However, negotiations broke down and the deal was "off the agenda" by March 2014. Reasons included Japan's stringent arms export ban laws, the intention of Turkey to attempt to export the Altay, and Japan's reluctance to license the joint engine.

Operators

Gallery

References

Bibliography

See also
 Type 61 (1st generation)
 Type 74 (2nd generation)
 Type 90 (3rd generation)

External links

 Development report of JSDF New tank (Japanese) 1 – Japanese Ministry of Defense.
 Development report of JSDF New tank (Japanese) 2 – Japanese Ministry of Defense.
 Development report of JSDF New tank (Japanese) 3 – Japanese Ministry of Defense.
 New Tank – Japanese Ministry of Defense TRDI.
 TRDI Official Photos of Type 10 tank #1
 TRDI Official Video of TK-X tank
  (Car Watch)
 

Main battle tanks of Japan
Post–Cold War main battle tanks
Mitsubishi Heavy Industries armored vehicles
Tanks with autoloaders
Military vehicles introduced in the 2010s
Fourth-generation main battle tanks